Sergiu Moisescu (born 20 November 1952) is a Romanian former footballer who played as a defender.

Honours
Argeș Pitești
Divizia A: 1978–79

References

External links
Sergiu Moisescu at Labtof.ro

1952 births
Living people
Romanian footballers
Association football defenders
Liga I players
Liga II players
FC Argeș Pitești players
ACF Gloria Bistrița players
Sportspeople from Pitești